Rodney Dee Hannah II (born August 9, 1987) is a former American football tight end in the National Football League for the Dallas Cowboys. He also was a member of the Virginia Destroyers in the United Football League. He played college basketball and college football at the University of Houston.

Early years

Hannah born to Rodney Sr. and Donna Hannah in Fresno, California. At a young age Hannah and his family moved to over 7 different locations throughout the United States before the age of 14, due to his father's professional career. Growing up Hannah was highly active, initially going into extreme sports. He eventually became a young sponsored athlete in the realm of skateboarding and inline skating at the age of 12 and in high school.

Upon moving to Roseville California Hannah traded in his skateboard for a backboard, picking up basketball while attending Roseville High School (CA) as a sophomore. He also intended to play football but his father would not allow it, restricting him from playing football and lifting weights – in concern for stunting his growth.

He was finally allowed to play both sports as a senior, becoming one of the top ranked athletes in the country, playing forward in basketball and wide receiver in football. He averaged 13 points and 10 rebounds per game, while being named an All-Conference selection. He finished among the state's top 10 leaders in receiving yards, rebounding and shots blocked.

College career

Hannah enrolled Yuba Junior College where he focused on playing basketball. As a freshman, he averaged 9 rebounds and 2.5 blocks per game. As a sophomore, he was named an All-Bay Valley Conference selection, after averaging 13.9 points, 8.7 rebounds and 1.9 blocks per game, while helping his team achieve the best season in school history, when Yuba finished with a 24–7 overall record and advanced to the Elite Eight of the California Junior College Tournament.

He transferred to the University of Houston on a basketball scholarship, appearing in 27 games, while averaging 1.9 points and 2.6 rebounds. As a senior in 2006, he realized he missed football and was a part of the C-USA Championship football team as a backup tight end, registering 11 receptions for 101 yards and one touchdown. After the season, Hannah was told that NFL scouts were interested in his physical skills.

Professional career

Dallas Cowboys
Hannah was not selected in the 2007 NFL Draft, because he was seen as a raw prospect. On April 23, the Dallas Cowboys signed him as an undrafted free agent, because they liked his physical skills and potential upside. On September 1, he was waived and signed to the practice squad 2 days later, where he spent the rest of the season.

On August 30, 2008, he was cut and later signed to the practice squad. On December 26, he was promoted to the active roster, to take the spot of injured wide receiver Isaiah Stanback.

In 2009, he was competing for the third-string tight end job against rookie John Phillips, but was limited with a broken hand he suffered in OTAs and was released on August 27.

Virginia Destroyers (UFL)
On August 29, 2011, Hannah was signed by the Virginia Destroyers of the United Football League.

References

1984 births
Living people
Sportspeople from Roseville, California
Players of American football from California
American football tight ends
Houston Cougars men's basketball players
Houston Cougars football players
Dallas Cowboys players
Virginia Destroyers players
American men's basketball players